Fasil Assefa Beyene (born 27 January 1984) is an Ethiopian painter known for his dominant theme the hustle and bustle of Merkato, and expressing Ethiopian pop art through his paintings.

He has been recognized as an Ambassador for Peace by the Universal Peace Foundation, and Inter Religious and International Federation for World Peace.

Biography
Born in Addis Abeba to Asnakech Degefu and Assefa Beyene, he grew up in an orthodox environment as the last child out of 11.
When Assefa was a child and still in Abedissa secondary school he was always fascinated of Jesus painting which was in his neighbors house and always tried to duplicate it. He goes on tour often.

Assefa's Talent in drawing and painting shone after that which made him chose painting as career path. After graduating from secondary school in 2001, he enrolled to Master Abyssinian fine Art and vocational training center then he obtained his diploma in 2002 from painting and drawing department, then he completed a certificate course from Abyssinia fine Art and vocational training center in 2003.

later on Assefa kept painting and working as an art teacher, then went on to study in the Addis Ababa University School of Fine Arts and design from 2005–2007; finally he was ready to exhibit his first solo art exhibition which was held in Imperial Hotel in Addis abeba under the name of Colors of the Millennium, Colors of Millennium exhibition has opened the doors for Fasil as a painting artist and from that on Assefa was set off for becoming a full-time painting artist and showing art exhibitions.

Exhibitions

Solo exhibitions

Group exhibitions

References
http://www.arts.org.tw/2017/eng/news170415k.html
http://www.imagomundiart.com/artworks/fasil-assefa-beyene-transportation
https://www.addiszefen.com/news/african-identity-underlies-sheraton%E2%80%99s-art-of-ethiopia/
https://www.thenextcanvas.com/fasil-assefa/
https://stgeorgeofethiopia.com/fasil-assefa/
https://www.sewasew.com/p/who-is-painter-fasil-assefa-%E1%88%B0%E1%8B%93%E1%88%8A-%E1%8D%8B%E1%88%B2%E1%88%8D-%E1%8A%A0%E1%88%B0%E1%8D%8B
https://www.academia.edu/20121724/An_Epic_Chronicle_Renaissance_of_Ethiopian_Contemporary_Art_2005-2015_RP_Vol._IX_No._XXX_MMXVI
https://issuu.com/gooddesignischeap/docs/sheraton_addis_art_of_ethiopia_brochure_2011_final
http://www.accademiariaci.info/compfile2019/winners/

1984 births
Living people
Ethiopian artists